North Wales was a European Parliament constituency which roughly covered the geographic region of North Wales, from 1979 until 1999.  It was held by the Conservative Party from 1979 until 1989, during which time it was their only seat in Wales.

Prior to its uniform adoption of proportional representation in 1999, the United Kingdom used first-past-the-post for the European elections in England, Scotland and Wales. The European Parliament constituencies used under that system were smaller than the later regional constituencies and only had one Member of the European Parliament each.

The seat became part of the much larger Wales constituency in 1999.

Boundaries
1979–1984: Anglesey, Caernarfon, Conwy, Denbigh, Flintshire East, Flintshire West, Merionnydd, Montgomery, Wrexham.

1984–1994: Alyn and Deeside, Caernarfon, Clwyd North West, Clwyd South West, Conwy, Delyn, Meirionnydd Nant Conwy, Montgomery, Wrexham, Ynys Mon.

1994–1999: Alyn and Deeside, Caernarfon, Clwyd North West, Clwyd South West, Conwy, Delyn, Wrexham, Ynys Mon.

Members of the European Parliament

Results

References

External links
 David Boothroyd's United Kingdom Election Results

European Parliament constituencies in Wales (1979–1999)
1979 establishments in Wales
1999 disestablishments in Wales
Constituencies established in 1979
Constituencies disestablished in 1999